This is the discography of English rock band All About Eve.

Albums

Studio albums

Live albums
Alongside these official live albums, naturally there exist numerous live bootleg recordings, the most well known of which is Blessed by Angels, released in 1992 by Italy-based label Kiss the Stone. It comprises eleven tracks from 1988 to 1991, several of which were later included on the compilation Keepsakes – A Collection.

Compilation albums

Video albums

EPs

Singles

Notes

References

Discographies of British artists
Rock music group discographies